A list of American films released in 1914.

See also
 1914 in the United States

References

External links

1914 films at the Internet Movie Database

1914
Films
Lists of 1914 films by country or language
1910s in American cinema